A referendum on a new constitution was held in Liberia on 3 July 1984. It was approved by 98.6% of voters, with a turnout of 82.2%. The new constitution came into force on 6 January 1986, following the 1985 general elections.

Results

References

Liberia
1984 in Liberia
Referendums in Liberia
Constitutional referendums in Liberia
July 1984 events in Africa